Lolly Willowes; or The Loving Huntsman is a novel by English writer Sylvia Townsend Warner, her first, published in 1926. It has been described as an early feminist classic.

Title
"Lolly" is the version of Laura's name used by her family after a mispronunciation by a young niece. She comes to dislike being called "Aunt Lolly" and to see the name as a symbol of her lack of independence. "The Loving Huntsman" refers to Satan, whom Laura envisions as hunting souls in a kindly way.

Synopsis
Lolly Willowes is a satirical comedy of manners incorporating elements of fantasy. It is the story of a middle-aged spinster who moves to a country village to escape her controlling relatives and takes up the practice of witchcraft. The novel opens at the turn of the twentieth century, with Laura Willowes moving from Somerset to London to live with her brother Henry and his family. The move comes in the wake of the death of Laura's father, Everard, with whom she lived at the family home, Lady Place. Laura's other brother, James, moves into Lady Place with his wife and his young son, Titus, with the intention to continue the family's brewing business. However, James dies suddenly of a heart attack and Lady Place is rented out, with the view that Titus, once grown up, will return to the home and run the business.

After twenty years of being a live-in aunt Laura finds herself feeling increasingly stifled both by her obligations to the family and by living in London. When shopping for flowers on the Moscow Road, Laura decides she wishes to move to the Chiltern Hills and, buying a guide book and map to the area, she picks the village of Great Mop as her new home. Against the wishes of her extended family, Laura moves to Great Mop and finds herself entranced and overwhelmed by the chalk hills and beech woods. Though sometimes disturbed by strange noises at night, she settles in and befriends her landlady and a poultry farmer.

After a while, Titus decides to move from his lodgings in Bloomsbury to Great Mop and be a writer, rather than managing the family business. Titus's renewed social and domestic reliance on Laura make her feel frustrated that even living in the Chilterns she cannot escape the duties expected of women. When out walking, she makes a pact with a force that she takes to be Satan, to be free from such duties. On returning to her lodgings, she discovers a kitten, whom she takes to be Satan's emissary, and names him Vinegar, in reference to an old picture of witches' familiars. Subsequently, her landlady takes her to a Witches' Sabbath attended by many of the villagers.

Titus is plagued with misadventures, such as having his milk constantly curdle and falling into a nest of wasps. Finally, he proposes marriage to a London visitor, Pandora Williams, who has treated his wasp stings, and the two retreat to London. Laura, relieved, meets Satan at Mulgrave Folly and tells him that women are like 'sticks of dynamite' waiting to explode and that all women are witches even 'if they never do anything with their witchcraft, they know it's there – ready!' The novel ends with Laura acknowledging that her new freedom comes at the expense of knowing that she belongs to the 'satisfied but profound indifferent ownership' of Satan.

Reception and legacy
The novel was well received by critics on its publication. In France it was shortlisted for the Prix Femina and in the USA it was the very first Book Of The Month for the Book Club.

Until the 1960s, the manuscript of Lolly Willowes was displayed in the New York Public Library.

In 2014, Robert McCrum chose it as one of the 100 Best Novels in English, for his list for The Guardian.

See also
 Devil in the arts and popular culture
 Vinegar Tom, a 1976 feminist play about witchcraft

Notes

External links

 

1926 British novels
British magic realism novels
Witchcraft in written fiction
Fiction about the Devil
Satanism in popular culture
Feminist novels
1926 debut novels
Chatto & Windus books
Viking Press books